In the 1930s, the United States Navy built two classes of flotilla leaders, the Porter class, and the Somers class. Due to the regulations of the London Naval Treaty, these 13 ships had a displacement of 1,850 tons, compared to the 1,500 tons of a "standard" destroyer. When the treaty ended with the outbreak of World War II in Europe in 1939, the much larger Fletcher class was constructed, making the differentiation irrelevant.

Following the war, destroyer leader (DL) was a hull classification symbol used by the U.S. Navy from the 1950s until 1975. These ships were more commonly called frigates, although they were much larger than frigates of other navies. They were intended to be larger and more capable than destroyers and to lead a destroyer task force. During the 1975 USN ship reclassification these ships were reclassified as guided missile destroyers (DDG) or guided missile cruisers (CG). The last one of these ships was decommissioned in 1999. A total of 41 ships bore this classification.

References

Ship classes of the United States Navy
Destroyer leader